Leafdale is a rural locality in the South Burnett Region, Queensland, Australia.

History 
Leafdale State School opened on 20 August 1924. It closed on 31 March 1933. It was at 32 Fairdale Road (corner of McEuen Road).

Leafdale Methodist Church was built in 1931 from timber. It was officially opened on Saturday 29 August 1931 by the Reverend Richard Pollard Pope, President of the Methodist Conference. The church is no longer extant. It was at 1 Mount McEuen Road.

Education 
There are no schools in Leafdale. The nearest government primary school is Wheatlands State School in neighbouring Wheatlands to the north-east. The nearest government secondary schools are Wondai State School (to Year 10) in Wondai to the south-east, Proston State School (to Year 10) in Proston to the west, and Murgon State High School (to Year 12) in Murgon to the east.

References 

South Burnett Region
Localities in Queensland